Urophora xanthippe is a species of fruit fly in the family Tephritidae.

Distribution
Ukraine, Kazakhstan, Turkmenistan, Tadzhikistan, Afghanistan

References

Urophora
Insects described in 1934
Diptera of Europe
Diptera of Asia